Hirojenel Benz "Hiro" Magalona Peralta (born November 7, 1994 in Manila, Philippines) is a Filipino former actor best known for his roles in Little Nanay and Tween Hearts.

Early life and education
Peralta was born in Manila and raised by his uncle's family in Quezon City. His father, Engelbert Garcia Peralta, was a sous chef turned custom broker, and his mother, Jean Senen Magalona Peralta, is a crooner in Japan. Perlata's mother is the second cousin of Francis Magalona. Peralta's elder brother, model Benjamin "Benjie" Peralta, was reportedly murdered in 2009, which was the reason behind her father's initial disapproval for him to enter the entertainment business.

Peralta spent his primary education at Esteban Abada Elementary School in 2006, his secondary education in St. Patrick School of Quezon City, where he and Liza Soberano were schoolmates. He was admitted to Trinity University of Asia, where he pursued his bachelor's degree in business administration majoring in financial management, but later deferred to pursue show business.

Career
He was discovered by German "Kuya Germs" Moreno in 2010 and made his first appearance on Moreno's variety show Walang Tulugan with the Master Showman under the screen name "Hiro Magalona" due to his father's initial disapproval following his brother's demise. In 2013, his management changed his screen name to his actual surname. Peralta went on to portray a leading man in Anna Karenina (2013 TV series), Little Nanay (2015), and various anthology series costarring multi-awarded actors. Peralta was also a cohost in the long-running morning show, Unang Hirit, before he left show business in 2018 with Sherlock Jr. as his last project.

Peralta now lives a private life as a businessman. In 2023, he appeared as a guest player with his friends in Family Feud Philippines.

Filmography

Television

Films

Accolades

Awards and nominations

References

External links

1994 births
Living people
Male actors from Manila
Hiro
GMA Network personalities